XHAPM-FM 95.1/XEAPM-AM 1340 is a combo radio station in Apatzingán, Michoacán. It is owned by Jose Laris Rodríguez, the president of Cadena RASA, and carries its Candela grupera format.

History
XEAPM received its concession on March 16, 1990.

References

Radio stations in Michoacán
Radio stations established in 1990